Farida Yasmin may refer to:
 Farida Yasmin (journalist), Bangladeshi journalist
 Farida Yasmin (singer), Bangladesh singer